Domain of Death is the third studio album by American death metal band Mortician, released on April 17, 2001 by Relapse Records.

Track listing

Personnel
Mortician
Will Rahmer – bass, vocals
Roger Beaujard – guitar, drum programming

Production
Roger Beaujard – producer, engineer
Will Rahmer – assistant engineer
Matthew F. Jacobson – executive producer
Wes Benscoter – cover art
Frank White – photography
Jonathan Canady – design

References

Mortician (band) albums
2001 albums
Albums with cover art by Wes Benscoter